Monte Cazazza is an American artist and composer best known for his seminal role in helping shape industrial music through recordings with the London-based Industrial Records in the mid-1970s.

Career
Cazazza, based primarily in San Francisco during his early career,  is credited with coining the phrase "Industrial Music for Industrial People".  This was later used to encapsulate the record label and the artists representing it. Later, the noise collages and experimental sound manipulation coming out of Industrial Records came to be known as industrial music. Cazazza had built up an underground reputation as a particularly volatile performer with a potentially dangerous and antisocial aesthetic.  Re/Search Magazine's Industrial Culture Handbook described his work as "insanity-outbreaks thinly disguised as art events".  The Futurist Sintesi show near the end of 1975 was heralded on a promo flier  as "Sex - religious show; giant statue of Jesus got chainsawed and gang raped into oblivion".

Cazazza did not limit his "performances" to the familiar dynamic of stage, audience, and audience reaction.  Much of his work involved acts designed for maximum shock value.  While a student at the Oakland campus of the California College of Arts and Crafts, Cazazza created a cement waterfall that disabled the main stairway of the building for his first sculpture assignment. He was expelled shortly afterwards. He once created a 15'x15' screw-together metal swastika and was known to visit his friends with a dead cat and formaldehyde that he would use to set the cat alight.

Much of his early work is considered obscene and virtually impossible to find. He worked with both print and sound collage, film, performance, and presentation. He was also heavily involved in the Mail art movement of the mid-1970s to early 1980s. Some of his early output was collected and released by The Grey Area of Mute in 1992 on the album, The Worst of Monte Cazazza.

Cazazza worked frequently with Factrix, an early industrial and experimental group from San Francisco, and recorded soundtracks for Mark Pauline and Survival Research Laboratories. More recent activity has included co-creating the independent distribution and film company MMFilms with Michelle Handelman and various soundtrack recordings.

Cazazza sent out photos of himself in an electric chair on the day of convicted murderer Gary Gilmore's execution. One of these was mistakenly printed in a Hong Kong newspaper as the real execution. Cazazza was also photographed alongside COUM Transmissions/Throbbing Gristle members Genesis P-Orridge and Cosey Fanni Tutti for the "Gary Gilmore Memorial Society" postcard, in which the three artists posed blindfolded and tied to chairs with actual loaded guns pointed at them to depict Gilmore's execution.

Discography

Solo
To Mom On Mother's Day (7") (Industrial Records) (1979)
At Leeds Fan Club/Scala, London/Oundle School (Cass) (Industrial Records) (1980)
Something for Nobody (7") (Industrial Records) (1980)
Stairway To Hell/Sex Is No Emergency (7") (Sordide Sentimental) (1982)
The Worst of Monte Cazazza (CD) (The Grey Area) (1992)
Kill Yur Self (12") (Telepathic Recordings) (1996)
Power Versus Wisdom, Live (CD) (Side Effects) (1996)
The Cynic (CD) (Blast First Petite) (2010)

with Factrix
California Babylon (LP) (Subterranean Records) (1982)

with Chaos Of The Night
Live At KFJC (CD) (Endorphine Factory)

with Psychic TV

Dreams Less Sweet (LP) (CBS) (1983)
Godstar (12") (Temple Records) (1985)
Mouth Of The Night (LP) (Temple Records) (1985)
Themes 3 (LP) (Temple Records) (1986)
Live In Heaven (LP) (Temple Records) (1987)
Allegory and Self (LP) (Temple Records) (1988)
A Real Swedish Live Show (LP) (Thee Temple Ov Psychick Youth Scandinavia) (1989)
Live In Glasgow Plus (CD) (Temple Records) (2003)
Godstar: Thee Director's Cut (CD) (Temple Records) (2004)

with The Atom Smashers
First Strike (LP) (Pathfinder Records) (1986)

with The Love Force
 "Climax", "Six Eyes From Hell", and "Liars (Feed Those Christians To The Lions)" on the album The Worst Of Monte Cazazza (CD) (The Grey Area) (1992)

with Esperik Glare
 "A City in the Sea" on the 7" As the Insects Swarm (7") (Static Hum Records) (2008) with Charlie Martineau

References

External links
 Review of The Worst of Monte Cazazza
 1979 interview

Year of birth missing (living people)
Living people
American industrial musicians
Industrial Records artists